The Dark Island is a six-part British television miniseries, produced by Gerard Glaister for the BBC. It premièred on 8 July 1962. It was later adapted for radio, which was transmitted in 1969. It was set on the Outer Hebridean island of Benbecula, though the majority of the series was filmed on South Uist.

Plot
The plot involves the discovery of a mysterious torpedo found on the shore of Benbecula. A naval team descends on the area to deal with the torpedo accompanied by Nicolson, an intrigued security officer. Further investigation of the torpedo reveals an international spy kit, the contents of which include a Finnish passport, British and Swedish currency, and most intriguing of all, a fragment of sheet music.

Nicolson is joined by fellow security operative Grant, and together they investigate the sudden appearance of the torpedo. Their investigations meet with resistance from the locals, and when their investigations lead to a murder, it becomes apparent that someone is trying to conceal something sinister. As Nicolson comes close to learning the truth, he is lured into a trap and is injured. When he comes to, he discovers that Grant has been murdered and he endeavours to find the people responsible. He eventually uncovers an elaborate espionage operation.

Cast
Robert Hardy – Nicolson
Francis Matthews – Grant
Michael Barrington – Dr. Glenville
Angela Browne – Mary Somers
Wallace Campbell – Donald MacAulley
Walter Carr – Davy McNeil
James Copeland – Petty officer
John Forbes-Robertson – Lieutenant
Morag Forsyth – Margaret
James Gibson – Dr. Mackenzie
Michael Golden – Swanson
Roy Hanlon – Corporal
Denis Holmes – Major Williams
Edward Jewesbury – George Hammond
Cyril Luckham – Brigadier
Alex McCrindle – Mr. Stewart
Douglas Murchie – Alec Thomson
Brydon Murdoch – Ian McLeod
William Sherwood – Colonel Jamieson
Ian Trigger – Attendant

Theme tune 
While the show is no longer seen, the theme tune remains a favourite with Scottish musicians, mostly accordionists and pipers. The air was originally called "Dr. Mackay's Farewell to Creagorry" by its composer, Iain MacLachlan about 1958. David Silver of Glasgow wrote the most common and famous words to the theme after the TV series appeared. Another set of lyrics was written by Stewart Ross of Inverness and is also quite well known, having been recorded by Calum and Fiona Kennedy as well as Daniel O' Donnell.  Both sets of lyrics were published in 1963.

Episode status
As of 2009, no episodes of The Dark Island have survived in the BBC archives; they were most likely wiped in the 1970s.  The entire 1969 radio series, however, does still exist, and can be found at various internet sources, usually under the banner "Old Time Radio".

References

External links

BBC television dramas
Lost BBC episodes
1960s British drama television series
1962 British television series debuts
1962 British television series endings
Black-and-white British television shows
English-language television shows